This article is an incomplete outline of terrorist incidents in Pakistan in 2021 in chronological order

January 
3 January - Machh attack

February 
 22 February - Ippi shooting

March 
 24 March - 2021 Chaman bombings

April 
 21 April - Quetta Serena Hotel bombing

May 
 21 May - 2021 Chaman bombings
 31 May - May 2021 Balochistan attacks

June 
 23 June - 2021 Lahore bombing

July 
14 July- a Bus carrying Chinese workers in the Dasu area of Upper Kohistan District fell into a ravine after an explosion, killing 13 people, including nine Chinese residents and 4 Pakistanis, and injured 28 others.

August 
 9 August - August 2021 Quetta bombing
 14 August - Karachi grenade attack
 20 August - Gwadar suicide attack
 26 August - August 2021 Balochistan attacks

September 
 5 September  - 2021 Quetta suicide attack
 11 September - Two soldiers of Frontier Corps South were killed and another was injured when armed men attacked their convoy in the Buleda area of Kech district.
 15 September  - Seven soldiers of the Pakistan Army were  killed during an intelligence-based operation in the Asman Manza area of South Waziristan.
 24 September  - Two security personnel were killed and five others injured in an attack in Awaran district.
 25 September  - Four security personnel were killed and two others injured in a bomb attack on a vehicle of the Frontier Corps in the Khosat area of Harnai district.

December 
 18 December - 2021 Karachi explosion

References

2021
Terrorist incidents in Pakistan in 2021